Geben may refer to
Geben, Silver sulfadiazine an antibacterial 
Geben, a town in Andırın district of Kahramanmaraş Province, Turkey